The enzyme 2-hydroxypropyl-CoM lyase (EC 4.4.1.23, epoxyalkane:coenzyme M transferase, epoxyalkane:CoM transferase, epoxyalkane:2-mercaptoethanesulfonate transferase, coenzyme M-epoxyalkane ligase, epoxyalkyl:CoM transferase, epoxypropane:coenzyme M transferase, epoxypropyl:CoM transferase, EaCoMT, 2-hydroxypropyl-CoM:2-mercaptoethanesulfonate lyase (epoxyalkane-ring-forming), (R)-2-hydroxypropyl-CoM 2-mercaptoethanesulfonate lyase (cyclizing, (R)-1,2-epoxypropane-forming)) is an enzyme with systematic name (R)-[or (S)]-2-hydroxypropyl-CoM:2-mercaptoethanesulfonate lyase (epoxyalkane-ring-forming). This enzyme catalyses the following reaction:

 (1) (R)-2-hydroxypropyl-CoM  (R)-1,2-epoxypropane + HS-CoM
 (2) (S)-2-hydroxypropyl-CoM  (S)-1,2-epoxypropane + HS-CoM

This enzyme requires zinc.

References

External links 
 

EC 4.4.1